Adrijana Lekaj (born 29 June 1995) is an inactive Kosovan–Croatian tennis player.

She has career-high WTA rankings of 325 in singles, achieved on 15 June 2015, and 321 in doubles, set on 10 August 2015. She has won two singles titles and eight doubles titles on the ITF Circuit.

Lekaj has represented Kosovo at the Billie Jean King Cup, making her debut in 2021.

ITF finals

Singles: 6 (2 titles, 4 runner–ups)

Doubles: 13 (8 titles, 5 runner–ups)

References

External links
 
 
 

1995 births
Living people
Sportspeople from Karlovac
Kosovan female tennis players
Croatian female tennis players
Croatian people of Kosovan descent
Croatian people of Albanian descent
Pepperdine Waves women's tennis players